Shin Noguchi (born 1976) is a Japanese street photographer, based in Kamakura and Tokyo. His work has been included in two books on street photography and he was 1st Prize Winner at Festival de Photo MAP Toulouse 2014.

Life and work 
Noguchi was born in 1976 in Shinjuku, Tokyo, Japan, and he has lived in Kamakura for 20 years.

He has been featured on The Leica Camera Blog, in Courrier International, Internazionale, Libération, Tages-Anzeiger, The Independent, and The Guardian. Some assignment work has also been published in Die Zeit, Die Zeit Wissen, and Libération.

Awards 
 2012: Finalist, Invisible Photographer Asia Awards 2012
 2013: Finalist, Invisible Photographer Asia Awards 2013
 2014: 1st Prize Winner, Prix Talents Festival de Photo MAP Toulouse 2014
 2016: 4th Prize, "National Awards, Japan" category, 2016 Sony World Photography Awards, World Photography Organisation
2018: Finalist, Invisible Photographer Asia Awards 2018

Exhibitions

Solo exhibitions
 2014: Something Here, MAP Toulouse 2014, France
 2016: Something Here, Space Place Gallery, Nizhny Tagil, Russia

Group exhibitions 
 2016: Simply, Center for Fine Art Photography, Fort Collins, CO, USA
 2016: Sony World Photography Awards 2016 Exhibition, World Photography Organisation, Ginza Place, Ginza, Tokyo
 2017: Photography on a Postcard, ThePrintSpace, Shoreditch, London
2019: Leica Street Photography Festival Exhibition, produced by Leica Camera China, Shanghai, China
2019: 12th International Architecture Biennale of São Paulo, São Paulo, Brazil

Publications

Publications by Noguchi 
 Hawaii. Self-published, Blurb, 2017.
 In Color In Japan. Eyeshot, 2020.

Publications with contributions by Noguchi 
 The Street Photographer's Manual. By David Gibson. Thames & Hudson, 2014. .
 100 Great Street Photographs. By David Gibson. Prestel, 2017. .

References

External links 
 

1976 births
Living people
Japanese photographers
Street photographers